Romain Lemarchand (born 26 July 1987) is a French former road cyclist, who competed professionally between 2010 and 2017 for the , , , ,  and  teams.

Major results

2007
 5th Chrono des Nations Espoirs
2008
 5th Chrono des Nations Espoirs
2009
 1st  Time trial, National Under-23 Road Championships
2010
 4th Paris–Mantes-en-Yvelines
 5th Overall Ronde de l'Oise
 7th Tour du Doubs
 9th Tro-Bro Léon
 9th Tour de la Somme
2013
 10th Overall Tour du Limousin
2014
 10th Overall Arctic Race of Norway

References

External links

Romain Lamerchand profile at Ag2r-La Mondiale

1987 births
Living people
French male cyclists
People from Palaiseau
Sportspeople from Essonne
Cyclists from Île-de-France
21st-century French people